Phaser may refer to:
 Raytheon Phaser, a directed-energy weapon
 Phaser (fictional weapon), a gun in the Star Trek universe
 Phaser (effect), in electronics, an audio signal processor used to distort the signal
 Light Phaser, a lightgun for the Master System console
 Xerox Phaser, a brand of printers
 Personnel Halting and Stimulation Response rifle (PHASR), a dazzler weapon
 Phaser, an insecticide containing the active ingredient endosulfan
 Phaser Digital Power Transducer from Second Wind
 Phaser (band), a Washington, D.C. rock band
 Phaser (game framework), HTML5 game creation framework

See also

Phase (disambiguation)
Phasor (disambiguation)
FASOR (disambiguation)